Bisaltes unicolor is a species of beetle in the family Cerambycidae. It was described by Galileo and Martins in 2003. It is known from Ecuador; the type locality is in Pichincha.

References

unicolor
Beetles described in 2003